Parkview Hockey Club is a hockey club affiliated to the Ulster Branch of the Irish Hockey Association. It was founded as Fisherwick Hockey Club in 1898, changing its name to Parkview in 1924. It is based in the County Antrim village of Doagh, near Ballyclare. The club's founding members were workers from the local spinning mills and from agriculture. The club currently plays in Section 2 of the Ulster Senior League. It fields two teams every Saturday.

Grounds
In 1970 a clubhouse built by the members was opened, and in 1974 it was renovated to include a bar. The senior team has to play its home matches on the artificial turf at the Valley Leisure Centre. Plans are advancing for the laying of an artificial pitch at Doagh.

Pre World War II record

Prior to World War II, Parkview played as a Junior League club. The major success during this period came in the 1936-37 season when the club’s first team won the Irish Junior Cup for the only time in the club’s history.

Senior League success

The period between World War II and mid 1970s was the most successful period for the club.

In 1948-49 Parkview won a test match against Antrim in the Ulster Senior League. In 1950, 1955 and 1956, Parkview lost three test matches to decide the destination of the Keightley Cup. The Kirk Cup was shared in 1955-56 and the Anderson Cup was won in 1958-59.

The 1960s saw Parkview bounce between the Senior League and the Qualifying League. However further success was achieved in knock-out competitions with another Kirk Cup win in 1966-67.

1980s to current day

1983 saw the club relegated to the Intermediate League and it took 11 years to regain senior status. Promoted after the 1993-94 season, Parkview initially challenged for promotion to Section 1 in its first few years back. After seven years, however, senior status was relinquished again when the Senior League was reorganized after the 2000-01 season. Parkview returned briefly for one season when they won Section 2 in 2001-02. In the 2006–07 season, Parkview finished in fourth place in Section 2, fifteen points behind Down.

Honours

 Irish Junior Cup
 1936-37
 Kirk Cup
 1966-67
 (Shared) 1955-56
 Anderson Cup
 1958-59

Sources

External links
Ulster Branch of Irish Hockey Association

Field hockey clubs in Northern Ireland
Sports clubs in County Antrim
1898 establishments in Ireland
Field hockey clubs established in 1898